Tommi Martikainen (born 13 January 1982) is a Finnish former racing cyclist. He finished in third place in the Finnish National Road Race Championships in 2006.

Major results
2005
 1st  National Time Trial Championships
2008
 1st Stage 2 Tour du Maroc
2011
 3rd National Road Race Championships
 3rd National Time Trial Championships
2012
 3rd National Time Trial Championships
2016
 2nd National Time Trial Championships

References

External links

1982 births
Living people
Finnish male cyclists
Sportspeople from Vaasa